Yothaka railway station is a railway station located in Bang Toei Subdistrict, Ban Sang District, Prachinburi Province. The station is a part of eastern railway line and is a class 4 railway station located 93.73 km (58 mi) from Hua Lamphong (Bangkok railway station).

Its name is assumed to be from its location near Paknam Yothaka (Yothaka estuary), where is a confluence of rivers Prachinburi and Nakhon Nayok. Or may be from the name of yothaka flower (Bauhinia monandra) because in the past this place has species of plants blooming all the way.

Train services 
 Ordinary train No. 275/276 Bangkok - Ban Klong Luk Border - Bangkok
 Ordinary train No. 279/280 Bangkok - Ban Klong Luk Border - Bangkok

References 

Railway stations in Thailand
Buildings and structures in Prachinburi province